Harding County is a county in the U.S. state of New Mexico. As of the 2010 census, the population was 695, making it the least populous county in the state, and the 14th-smallest county by population in the United States. Its county seat is Mosquero. The county is named for United States President Warren G. Harding, and was created (from parts of Union and Mora Counties) on the day of his inauguration as president on March 4, 1921, making him the last president to have a county named after him.

The only incorporated cities in Harding County are Roy and Mosquero.

Geography
It is divided between a high, nearly treeless prairie to the northwest (the southern limit of the High Plains), and a lower semi-desert rangeland to the southeast, by the eastern portion of the steep Canadian Escarpment. The Canadian River, in a deep and narrow canyon, forms the western border with Mora County; the southwest border runs along the edge of the Bell Ranch land in San Miguel County. The eastern part of Harding County is underlain in part by the Bravo Dome carbon dioxide gas field, which is commercially extracted.

Adjacent counties
 Union County – northeast
 Quay County – southeast
 San Miguel County – south
 Mora County – west
 Colfax County – northwest

National protected area
 Kiowa National Grassland (part)

Demographics

2000 census
As of the 2000 census, there were 810 people, 371 households, and 231 families living in the county. The population density was 0.38 people per square mile (0.15/km2). There were 545 housing units at an average density of 0.26 per square mile (0.1/km2). The racial makeup of the county was 84.32% White, 0.37% Black or African American, 1.36% Native American, 10.62% from other races, and 3.33% from two or more races. 44.94% of the population were Hispanic or Latino of any race.

There were 371 households, out of which 22.10% had children under the age of 18 living with them, 52.60% were married couples living together, 7.50% had a female householder with no husband present, and 37.50% were non-families. 35.30% of all households were made up of individuals, and 21.00% had someone living alone who was 65 years of age or older. The average household size was 2.18 and the average family size was 2.84.

In the county, the population was spread out, with 20.20% under the age of 18, 4.60% from 18 to 24, 18.80% from 25 to 44, 28.10% from 45 to 64, and 28.30% who were 65 years of age or older. The median age was 49 years. For every 100 females there were 102.50 males. For every 100 females age 18 and over, there were 102.50 males.

The median income for a household in the county was $26,111, and the median income for a family was $36,667. Males had a median income of $22,750 versus $15,750 for females. The per capita income for the county was $16,240. About 12.90% of families and 16.30% of the population were below the poverty line, including 31.30% of those under age 18 and 11.30% of those age 65 or over.

2010 census
As of the 2010 census, there were 695 people, 349 households, and 213 families living in the county. The racial makeup of the county was 86.9% white, 1.2% American Indian, 0.3% black or African American, 10.2% from other races, and 1.4% from two or more races. Those of Hispanic or Latino origin made up 43.0% of the population. In terms of ancestry, 11.0% were German, and 2.2% were American.

Of the 349 households, 15.5% had children under the age of 18 living with them, 51.3% were married couples living together, 5.4% had a female householder with no husband present, 39.0% were non-families, and 34.7% of all households were made up of individuals. The average household size was 1.99 and the average family size was 2.49. The median age was 55.9 years.

The median income for a household in the county was $33,750 and the median income for a family was $56,563. Males had a median income of $36,167 versus $29,111 for females. The per capita income for the county was $14,684. About 9.1% of families and 19.1% of the population were below the poverty line, including 11.6% of those under age 18 and 24.7% of those age 65 or over.

Communities

Villages 
 Mosquero (county seat)

 Roy

Unincorporated communities 
 Mills
 Solano

Politics
Harding County is conservative in presidential elections. It last supported a Democrat for president in 1948, and that was by a margin of just 4 votes.

See also
 National Register of Historic Places listings in Harding County, New Mexico

References

 
1921 establishments in New Mexico
Populated places established in 1921